Chrysopidia elegans is a green lacewing species in the genus Chrysopidia found in China and Nepal.

References

External links

Chrysopidae
Insects described in 1973
Insects of China
Insects of Nepal